Delgado Community College (DCC) is a public community college in Louisiana with campuses throughout the New Orleans metropolitan area. Its current campuses are in New Orleans (Orleans Parish) and in Jefferson Parish. The original main campus—City Park Campus—is located in the Navarre neighborhood adjacent to New Orleans City Park.

Delgado Community College is one of nine community colleges which operate under the auspices of the Louisiana Community and Technical College System. The institution originally opened in 1921 as Delgado Trades (plural) School; it went through several reorganizations and was finally declared "Delgado Community College" by the Louisiana State Legislature in 1980, under the administration of Governor David C. Treen.

Its service area includes New Orleans and Jefferson, St. Charles, St. John the Baptist, and St. Tammany parishes.

Campuses
Sidney Collier Campus is in East New Orleans. It is in proximity to St. Bernard Parish and St. Tammany Parish.

There were two campuses in St. Tammany Parish: one in Slidell, Louisiana, the Slidell Learning Center, and one in Covington, Louisiana, the Delgado Northshore campus that first opened in 1987. The Covington campus closed at the end of the spring 2014 semester. The Slidell campus closed in 2016 due to financial issues.

Athletics
The Delgado Dolphins are composed of 3 athletic teams representing Delgado Community College in intercollegiate athletics, including baseball and men's and women's basketball. The Dolphins compete in National Junior College Athletic Association Division 1, Region 23. The Dolphins sports teams are members of the MISS-LOU Junior College Conference.

The Dolphins baseball team plays at "Rags" Scheuermann Field at Kirsch-Rooney Stadium and the basketball teams play at the Michael Williamson Center.

Notable alumni
 Billy Kennedy, assistant basketball coach for  Wichita State
Steve Theriot, member of the Louisiana House of Representatives (1988–1996) and state legislative auditor (2004–2009)
Irma Thomas, Grammy Award winning artist.
Scott Arceneaux Jr., member of New Orleans hip hop duo Suicideboys

Notable faculty and staff

Cameron Henry, member of the Louisiana House of Representatives from District 82, is a former adjunct business professor at Delgado.
Nita Rusich Hutter, District 104 state representative from St. Bernard Parish is an administrator at Delgado.

References

External links

 Official website

 
Educational institutions established in 1921
Universities and colleges accredited by the Southern Association of Colleges and Schools
NJCAA athletics
1921 establishments in Louisiana